The 2016–17 Georgia State Panthers women's basketball team represented Georgia State University in the 2016–17 NCAA Division I women's basketball season. The Panthers, coached by Sharon Baldwin-Tener in her seventh, were a member of the Sun Belt Conference, and played their home games on campus at the GSU Sports Arena. They finished the season 12–18, 8–10 in Sun Belt play to finish in a tie for seventh place. They lost in the first round of the Sun Belt women's tournament to South Alabama.

Roster

Schedule

|-
!colspan=9 style="background:#003399; color:#FFFFFF;"| Non-conference regular season

|-
!colspan=9 style="background:#003399; color:#FFFFFF;"| Sun Belt regular season

|-
!colspan=9 style="background:#003399; color:#FFFFFF;"| Sun Belt Women's Tournament

See also
 2016–17 Georgia State Panthers men's basketball team

References

Georgia State
Georgia State Panthers women's basketball seasons